Dimanche Martin was a French variety show created and presented by Jacques Martin from 1980 to 1998 on Antenne 2. At its peak it achieved 72% viewership in 1983.

References

External links
 

1980 French television series debuts
1998 French television series endings
French-language television shows
France 2